Odontopacha fenestrata is a moth of the family Lasiocampidae. The species was first described by Per Olof Christopher Aurivillius in 1909. It is found in Somalia and Tanzania.

References

Moths described in 1909
Lasiocampidae
Moths of Africa
Fauna of Somalia
Insects of Tanzania